The Swann's Point Plantation Site is an archaeological site near the James River in Surry County, Virginia.  The Swann's Point area, located west of the mouth of Gray Creek, has a rich historic of precolonial Native American occupation, as well as significant early colonial settlements.  It was first granted to Richard Pace, whose warning famously saved the Jamestown Colony during the Indian Massacre of 1622.  The Paces abandoned their settlement in 1624.

In 1628, the tip of Swann's Point was a site at which the colonists of Jamestown traded with the local natives.  The Swann family association with the area began in 1635, when William Swann acquired a land patent for 1200 acres at Swann's Point. The plantation increased to 1650 acres by patents to Col. Thomas Swann in 1638 and 1655  

After Bacon's Rebellion (1676) the King's Commissioners sent to Virginia in investigate the "troubles" held their proceedings at Swann's Point. It was here, then, that petitions were heard complaining of the conduct of William Hartwell, captain of Governor Berkeley's guard, in the suppression of the rebellion.

Swann's Point was sold by the son of Col. Thomas Swann in 1706 to John Joseph Jackman, the plantation was purchased in turn from Jackman in 1709 by Major George Marable who three months later sold the plantation to his brother-in-law, John Hartwell.  Upon his death in 1714, Swann's Point passed to John Hartwell's daughter, Elizabeth, then a minor. When she later married Richard Cocke of Henrico County they made their residence at Swann's Point. It remained in the Cocke family for several generations and was the birthplace of General John Hartwell Cocke who later became associated with Bremo in Fluvanna County.

In the mid-1900s, the plantation was purchased by state Sen. Garland Gray, who used it as a summer home until the manor house was destroyed by fire.  Later, Gray, who was one of the wealthiest men in Virginia and owned tens of thousands of acres of land bet the Swann's Point property on game of cards and lost.  True to his word he transferred the property to the winner.

The site which contains 17th century graves was listed on the National Register of Historic Places in 1975.  A portion of the Swann's Point area was donated by the owners to the National Park Service in 1974 to forestall the construction of a bridge across the James River to the area.

See also
National Register of Historic Places listings in Surry County, Virginia

References

Archaeological sites on the National Register of Historic Places in Virginia
National Register of Historic Places in Surry County, Virginia
Cocke family of Virginia